Yershovsky (masculine), Yershovskaya (feminine), or Yershovskoye (neuter) is the name of several rural localities in Russia.

Modern localities
Yershovsky (rural locality), Chelyabinsk Oblast, a settlement in Novoyershovsky Selsoviet of Kizilsky District in Chelyabinsk Oblast; 
Yershovskaya, Arkhangelsk Oblast, a village in Vadyinsky Selsoviet of Konoshsky District in Arkhangelsk Oblast; 
Yershovskaya, Moscow Oblast, a village in Dmitrovskoye Rural Settlement of Shatursky District in Moscow Oblast;

Alternative names
Yershovskaya, alternative name of Yershevskaya, a village in Telegovsky Selsoviet of Krasnoborsky District in Arkhangelsk Oblast; 
Yershovskaya, alternative name of Yershovka, a village in Lyavlensky Selsoviet of Primorsky District in Arkhangelsk Oblast; 
Yershovskaya, alternative name of Yershevskaya, a village in Rostovsky Selsoviet of Ustyansky District in Arkhangelsk Oblast;